Danilovka is a rural locality (a settlement) in Starobelokurikhinsky Selsoviet, Altaysky District, Altai Krai, Russia. The population was 15 as of 2013. There are 3 streets.

Geography 
Danilovka is located 52 km west of Altayskoye (the district's administrative centre) by road. Belokurikha is the nearest rural locality.

References 

Rural localities in Altaysky District, Altai Krai